The 1987 Manly-Warringah Sea Eagles season was the 41st in the club's history since their entry into the then New South Wales Rugby Football League premiership in 1947.

The 1987 Sea Eagles were coached by triple Manly premiership player and former Kangaroo Tour captain Bob Fulton. Captaining the side was Queensland back rower Paul Vautin. The club competed in the New South Wales Rugby League's 1987 Premiership season and played its home games at the 27,000 capacity Brookvale Oval.

Ladder

Regular season

Bye

Bye

Finals

Major Semi-Final

Grand final

From the outset Manly's Cliff Lyons attempted to find gaps out wide in Canberra's defence and kept the Raiders hemmed in on their own side of half-way with his astute kicking. Lyons stepped inside the Raiders' defence and after a seventy-metre burst found Noel Cleal stampeding on to the ball but Cleal's final pass to Des Hasler was ruled forward. Another promising Manly raid broke down when Lyons' reverse pass to O'Connor was put to ground.

Manly continued to put pressure on the Raiders defence with both speedsters Michael O'Connor and Dale Shearer trying to catch the Raiders out with long range kicks to their in-goal area in front of the SCG hill, but both were only just beaten to the ball each time by Gary Belcher and Gary Coyne respectively.

In the 27th minute Lyons eventually broke through on his third threatening attempt. Scurrying from a scrum win on the Canberra quarter-line, Lyons brushed off the tackle of Chris O'Sullivan and stepped inside Belcher to score.

The Sea Eagles led 6-0 at half-time, with a ball-and-all tackle by Belcher on Dale Shearer just two metres from the Canberra tryline preventing the lead being greater.

From the restart kick-off Belcher fielded the ball in his in-goal but was penalised for shepherding behind Chris O'Sullivan as he ran the ball out. It was a gift penalty for O'Connor to take Manly out to an 8-0 lead.

The Sea Eagles kept the pressure on Canberra by charging down two attempted clearing kicks by a tiring Mal Meninga. Only occasionally did the Raiders break through. After a run by Peter Jackson, Manly's Phil Daley was penalised for a high tackle and Meninga's goal finally put Canberra on the scoreboard.

Fatigue and the heat began to take a toll on the players, though one of the more surprising efforts was Manly's English prop Kevin Ward who ran and tackled strongly all day. Meninga, who had only played 60 minutes of football since breaking his arm in a game against Manly almost two months earlier, was replaced by Kevin Walters after 15 minutes of the second half and Manly's Gibbs, Cleal and Cochrane all went down hurt at different stages as the pace of the match slowed (for his part, Cochrane still can't remember the second half). Soon after a successful penalty goal from O'Connor, a Dale Shearer cross field kick from the Raiders 22m line was grounded over the line by O'Connor in the Paddington corner. While Manly winger David Ronson was thought to be offside (though he didn't get involved in the play, he was still within 10 metres of O'Connor), many claim that the Manly centre should have been ruled offside as he got the ball "rather quickly" (television replays would prove inconclusive as there was no footage of where O'Conner was when Shearer kicked). However, referee Mick Stone ruled that Manly's international centre was onside and O'Connor was awarded the try. He converted his own try (giving him 4/4 goals at that point) and Manly had a premiership winning 16-2 lead.

A brief hope of a fightback loomed after an ingeniously constructed "trojan horse" move by Canberra. Chris O'Sullivan went down "injured" after being tackled and then miraculously popped up in the next passage of play to take the inside pass from Ivan Henjak and score. With Meninga off the ground, Gary Belcher converted to narrow the scores to 16-8.

Ron Gibbs' return from the head-bin helped snap the Sea Eagles out of their complacency. Daley's tackle on Canberra replacement Terry Regan and Dale Shearer's try-saving tackle on Ashley Gilbert three minutes from full-time ended any chance of a Canberra fightback. Paul Vautin led the charge back up-field with Hasler being bundled into the corner post after a run-around movement with O'Connor. The Manly centre also had a try taken off him just minutes after his previous try when Mick Stone ruled a pass from Cliff Lyons had gone forward.

Right on full-time, O'Connor landed his fifth goal from five attempts after the Raiders were penalised in front of their own posts for being offside after a tap-kick restart. The 18-8 scoreline was a fair indication of Manly's supremacy on the day and a just result considering the Sea Eagles' consistency throughout the year.

Manly became the first team other than Canterbury-Bankstown or Parramatta to win the grand final during the 1980s (Manly had been beaten grand finalists in 1982 and 1983, losing both times to Parramatta).

For Manly coach Bob Fulton, premiership glory in a nine-year coaching career was finally achieved. For the dual Canberra coaches it marked a milestone. It was a sad ending to the long club coaching career of Don Furner, the man who brought Canberra into the competition. For his partner Wayne Bennett, the tactician behind the side, it was a disappointing exit but another door was about to open on his own stellar coaching career with the Brisbane Broncos and a continuing career as Queensland Origin coach.

1987 World Club Challenge

1987 saw the second World Club Challenge game between the reigning New South Wales Rugby League premiers and the reigning Rugby Football League (England) champions. This game was held in England less than two weeks following the 1987 NSWRL grand final.

The match was played at 7:45pm on a dry Wednesday night, 7 October at the Central Park ground in Wigan. A crowd of 36,895 was in attendance for the game, though unofficial estimates from those present put the attendance as high as 50,000. The game was refereed by RFL international referee John Holdsworth. Former four-time Manly premiership winning  Graham Eadie, who at the time was playing in England with 1987 Challenge Cup winners Halifax, was on hand as a match commentator as was dual Manly premiership player (and captain of the 1978 team) and the skipper of the 1982 Invincibles, Max Krilich.

No tries were scored in what was a closely fought and, at times, spiteful encounter. Michael O'Connor opened the scoring for Manly with a successful penalty kick in only the second minute, which would turn out to be the only time the Sea Eagles scored. Tempers flared as the match went on, punctuated by more penalties and a few unsavoury incidents: 
Manly forward Ron Gibbs became the first person to be sent off in a World Club Challenge match for illegal use of the elbow when taking out Joe Lydon high after he attempted a drop-goal;
An all-in brawl erupted after Dale Shearer was lifted in a tackle then started a punch-up in the ruck with Brian Case;
After taking Manly captain Paul Vautin over the touchline, a group of Wigan defenders went on to take him over the fence causing another all-in brawl;
Later, when Shearer brought down Lydon in defence, he appeared to step on the Great Britain international's head as he got up after making the tackle.
Amongst all of these incidents Wigan's David Stephenson kicked four penalty goals, which in the end would prove decisive. The score was 8 - 2 in favour of the home side as the final whistle blew, prompting the overjoyed Wigan supporters to flood onto the field to celebrate with the players.

In his biography The Strife and Times of Paul Vautin written by Mike Coleman and released in 1992, the Manly captain told that the Sea Eagles players were so convinced that they would beat Wigan after their grand final win over the Canberra Raiders and after the undefeated 1986 Kangaroo Tour, that they treated the trip to England more as a holiday than anything serious and continued celebrating their GF win while there. Vautin and the other Manly players believe that their poor attitude is what ultimately cost them the game. Wigan on the other hand, led by their Kiwi coach Graham Lowe and featuring 11 Great Britain and one New Zealand international (compared to 5 Australian and one New Zealand international for Manly), took the game very seriously with pride their main motivation after the Great Britain Lions had been humiliated by the Australian's with 4 straight 3-0 Ashes series losses since the disastrous 1979 Australasian tour and the popular belief that the NSWRL Premiership was superior to the RFL's.

In a twist, after leading Wigan to numerous cup titles over the next two seasons, Graham Lowe would become Manly's head coach from 1990-1992.

Player statistics
Note: Games and (sub) show total games played, e.g. 1 (1) is 2 games played. List does not include World Club Challenge.

Representative Players

International
 Australia – Michael O'Connor, Dale Shearer
 New Zealand – Darrell Williams

State

 New South Wales – Noel Cleal, Phil Daley, Des Hasler, Cliff Lyons, Michael O'Connor
 Queensland – Dale Shearer, Paul Vautin

City vs Country
 City Origin – Des Hasler, Michael O'Connor
 Country Origin – Ron Gibbs, Noel Cleal, Mal Cochrane

References

External links
Manly Warringah Sea Eagles official website
National Rugby League official website

Manly Warringah Sea Eagles seasons
Manly-Warringah Sea Eagles season
Manly-Warringah Sea Eagles season